Parenthood is an American sitcom television series based on the 1989 film of the same name. Executive produced by Ron Howard (who also co-wrote and directed the film), the series aired for one season on NBC from August 20, 1990, to August 11, 1991.

Parenthood was one of many failed movie-to-TV adaptations in the 1990–91 season, also including Baby Talk on ABC's TGIF (a follow up to Look Who's Talking), Ferris Bueller on NBC and Uncle Buck on CBS.

Synopsis
The series delivered seriocomic vignettes on rearing children, revolving around four generations of a middle-class California family, the Buckmans (the movie took place in St. Louis, Missouri). The Huffners of the film were renamed the Merricks on the TV series.

The pilot episode was considered by USA Today and the New York Post as the best movie-to-TV spin-off since M*A*S*H. However, ratings for the series were low and Parenthood was canceled after 12 episodes.

The series is notable for featuring a number of people who at the time were unheard of but later became famous. One of the writers on the show was Joss Whedon. The cast featured Leonardo DiCaprio, David Arquette, and Thora Birch (billed simply as "Thora" here).

Cast and characters
David Arquette as Tod Hawks (portrayed by Keanu Reeves in the film)
Jayne Atkinson as Karen Buckman (portrayed by Mary Steenburgen in the film) 
Ed Begley Jr. as Gil Buckman (portrayed by Steve Martin in the film) 
Thora Birch as Taylor Buckman (portrayed by Alisan Porter in the film)
Maryedith Burrell as Helen Buckman (portrayed by Dianne Wiest in the film)  
Leonardo DiCaprio as Garry Buckman (portrayed by Joaquin Phoenix in the film) 
Mary Jackson as Great Grandma Greenwell (portrayed by Helen Shaw in the film)
Zachary La Voy as Justin Buckman (reprising his role in the film)
Sheila MacRae as Marilyn Buckman (portrayed by Eileen Ryan in the film)
Bess Meyer as Julie Buckman Hawks (portrayed by Martha Plimpton in the film)
Susan Norman as Susan Buckman Merrick (portrayed by Harley Jane Kozak in the film)
Ken Ober as Nathan Merrick (portrayed by Rick Moranis in the film)
Ivyann Schwan as Patty Merrick (reprising her role in the film)
Max Elliott Slade as Kevin Buckman (portrayed by Jasen Fisher in the film)
William Windom as Frank Buckman (portrayed by Jason Robards in the film)

*Max Elliott Slade, who portrayed Kevin Buckman on the TV series also portrayed a younger version of Steve Martin's character in the film.

Episodes

Syndication
The show was featured on the now-defunct cable network Trio in 2005 as part of their "Brilliant But Cancelled" series of shows that were cancelled before their time.

New series
A new television adaptation of the movie premiered on NBC in March 2010 and ran until January 2015. Craig T. Nelson and Bonnie Bedelia played the parental roles, joined by Peter Krause, Lauren Graham, Erika Christensen, Dax Shepard and Monica Potter.

References

External links
On the set of Parenthood -- a behind the scenes look at the NBC sitcom that does a convincing imitation of family life
 

1990 American television series debuts
1991 American television series endings
1990s American single-camera sitcoms
English-language television shows
NBC original programming
Live action television shows based on films
Television series by Universal Television
Television shows set in California
Television series about families
Parenthood (franchise)
Television series by Imagine Entertainment